Ataxocerithium is a genus of sea snails, marine gastropod molluscs in the family Newtoniellidae.

Species

Species in the genus Ataxocerithium include:
 Ataxocerithium abnormale (Sowerby III, 1903)
 Ataxocerithium applenum Iredale, 1936
 Ataxocerithium beasleyi Cotton & Godfrey, 1938
 †Ataxocerithium biaulax Darragh, 2017 
 Ataxocerithium brazieri Cossmann, 1906
 † Ataxocerithium cingulatum (Grönwall & Harder, 1907) 
 † Ataxocerithium concatenatum Tate, 1894 
 Ataxocerithium eximium Houbrick, 1987
 Ataxocerithium gemmulatum (Woolacott, 1957)
 Ataxocerithium huttoni Cossmann, 1895
 † Ataxocerithium kaawaense Laws, 1936 
 Ataxocerithium kanakorum Cecalupo & Perugia, 2017
 † Ataxocerithium multicostulatum Darragh, 2017 
 † Ataxocerithium otopleuroides Darragh, 2017 
 † Ataxocerithium pyramidale Finlay, 1924
 †Ataxocerithium robustum Finlay, 1924 
 † Ataxocerithium scitulum Maxwell, 1992 
 Ataxocerithium serotinum  (Adams, 1855)
 † Ataxocerithium simplex Marwick, 1928
 † Ataxocerithium singulare Maxwell, 1992
 † Ataxocerithium tricingulatum Marwick, 1924
 † Ataxocerithium venustulum Darragh, 2017 
Species brought into synonymy
 Ataxocerithium abbreviatum (Brazier, 1877): synonym of Ataxocerithium brazieri Cossmann, 1906
 Ataxocerithium conturbatum Iredale, 1936: synonym of Ataxocerithium serotinum (A. Adams, 1855)
 Ataxocerithium fucatum (Pease, 1861): synonym of Cerithium interstriatum G. B. Sowerby II, 1855
 † Ataxocerithium perplexum Marshall & Murdoch, 1919: synonym of Zeacumantus lutulentus (Kiener, 1842)
 Ataxocerithium perplexus P. Marshall & R. Murdoch, 1919: synonym of Zeacumantus lutulentus (Kiener, 1842)
 Ataxocerithium pullum (Philippi, 1845): synonym of Eumetula pulla (Philippi, 1845)
 Ataxocerithium scruposum Iredale, 1936: synonym of Ataxocerithium serotinum (A. Adams, 1855)

References

Newtoniellidae
Taxa named by Ralph Tate